Kirsten Flipkens was the defending champion, but did not compete in the juniors that year.

Michaëlla Krajicek won the tournament, defeating Jessica Kirkland in the final, 6–1, 6–1.

Seeds

Draw

Finals

Top half

Section 1

Section 2

Bottom half

Section 3

Section 4

Sources
Draw

Girl's Singles
US Open, 2004 Girls' Singles